Wat Langka (UNGEGN: , ALA-LC:) is a wat in Phnom Penh, Cambodia. It is one of the five ancient pagodas in Phnom Penh that was built in 1422.  The construction of Dum Dong as a place of refuge (as a place of refuge) for the storage of the Trinity and as a meeting place for Khmer and Sri Lankan monks. As a reminder of this gathering, this pagoda was also called Wat Lanka. Wat Langka is located southwest of the Independence Monument, Sihanouk Blvd. and St. 51.

Images

References

Buddhist temples in Phnom Penh